is a Japanese manga series by Mari Yamazaki. It won the third Manga Taishō and the Short Story Award at the 14th Tezuka Osamu Cultural Prize. The manga has been licensed in North America by Yen Press. Fuji TV produced a live-action film adaptation and released on April 28, 2012. A second film, Thermae Romae II, was released in 2014. An anime television adaptation by DLE Inc. aired in Japan on Fuji TV's Noitamina block in January 2012. The show has been licensed by Discotek Media in North America, and by Siren Visual in Australia. An original net animation (ONA) anime series adaptation by NAZ titled Thermae Romae Novae was announced and premiered on Netflix in March 2022.

Plot
The story follows an ancient Roman architect named Lucius, who is having trouble coming up with ideas. One day, he discovers a hidden tunnel underneath a spa that leads him to a modern Japanese bath house. Inspired by the innovations found there, he creates his own spa, Roma Thermae, bringing the modern ideas to his time.

Each subsequent chapter follows Lucius facing some sort of a problem, just to be swept to Japan once again. He visits modern bath houses, personal baths, waterparks, fertility festivals, and even zoos. There, he always happens to find the inspiration to solve the exact problem he has been tasked with.

Characters

A Roman thermae architect who excels in designs ends up discovering modern Japanese baths, believing them to be the baths of 'flat-faced slaves'. He uses these ideas in his own work back home. Later on, inspired others with his discoveries. But his endeavours cost him his marriage, and suspicion of either being Emperor Hadrian's homosexual lover, to destroying businesses.

 Lucius's friend and a marble sculptor. Oftentimes, he becomes Lucius's carver in his projects.

 Emperor of Roman Empire. Initially commissioned Lucius of building a private thermae, then commissioned him for more baths.

 Satsuki Odate

 A 28 year old Japanese woman who is both the town geisha, and an expert in Roman history. She is also a polyglot, can speak and translate Latin. Fell in love with Lucius.

Anime
A flash anime adaptation by DLE aired on Fuji TV in its Noitamina block between January 12, 2012, and January 26, 2012. The series was released on Blu-ray Disc on April 20, 2012, and included an unaired episode. Siren Visual released an English-subtitled version in Australia in October 2012. The series was licensed for release in North America in 2013, and a re-release is planned on December 29, 2020, with an English dub. An original net animation advertisement of toothbrush company Reach was released on April 15, 2014.

During Netflix Anime Festival 2020, it was announced that the series would receive a new original net animation (ONA) anime adaptation by NAZ titled Thermae Romae Novae. The series is directed by Tetsuya Tatamitani and written by Yūichirō Momose. It premiered on Netflix on March 28, 2022. Each episode also has a live action section where author Mari Yamazaki explores different hot springs in Japan at the end of the episode.

Episode list (DLE)

Episode list (Netflix)

Film

Cast
 Hiroshi Abe as Lucius
 Aya Ueto as Mami Yamakoshi
 Kazuki Kitamura as Ceionius
 Riki Takeuchi as Tateno
 Kai Shishido as Antoninus
 Takashi Sasano as Shūzo Yamakoshi
 Masachika Ichimura as Hadrian
 Midoriko Kimura as Yumi Yamakoshi
 Katsuya as Marcus

Reception
As of July 29, the film had a box office gross of US$74,091,903. It was the second highest-grossing domestic film at the Japanese box office in 2012 and, as of January 5, 2015, is the 95th highest-grossing film in Japan, with ¥5.98 billion.

Hiroshi Abe won Outstanding Performance by an Actor in a Leading Role for the film at the 36th Japan Academy Film Prize presentation. Thermae Romae also received a nomination for Mitsuo Harada's art direction at the same awards.

Thermae Romae earned HK$1,498,789 at the Hong Kong box office.

The film had its North American premiere in September 2012 at the Toronto International Film Festival.

References

External links
  
 
 
 

2008 manga
2012 anime television series debuts
2012 films
2022 anime ONAs
Bathing
Comedy anime and manga
Comics about time travel
Comics set in ancient Rome
Discotek Media
Enterbrain manga
Films about time travel
Films set in ancient Rome
Flash television shows
Japanese animated films
Japanese-language Netflix original programming
Kadokawa Dwango franchises
Live-action films based on manga
Manga adapted into films
Manga series
Manga Taishō
Naz (studio)
Netflix original anime
Noitamina
Seinen manga
Winner of Tezuka Osamu Cultural Prize (Short Story Award)
Yen Press titles